The Best of Chic, Volume 2 is a greatest hits album of recordings by American R&B band Chic, released by Atlantic Records/Rhino Records/Warner Music in 1992. The compilation focuses on single releases and album tracks from the band's later career, 1979–1983.

Track listing
All tracks written by Bernard Edwards and Nile Rodgers.
"Rebels Are We" (7" Edit)  - 3:21 
 Original version appears on 1980 album Real People
"What About Me"  - 4:18
 From 1979 album Risqué
"26"  - 4:04 
 From 1980 album Real People
"Will You Cry (When You Hear This Song)"  - 4:09
 From 1979 album Risqué
"Stage Fright" (7" Edit)  - 3:39 
 Original version appears on 1981 album Take It Off
"Real People" (7" Edit)  -  3:45 
 Original version appears on 1980 album Real People
"Hangin'" (7" Edit)  - 3:45 
 Original version appears on 1982 album Tongue in Chic
"Give Me the Lovin'" (7" Edit)  - 3:38 
 Original version appears on 1983 album Believer
"At Last I Am Free"  - 7:11
 From 1978 album C'est Chic
"Just Out Of Reach"  - 3:47 
 From 1981 album Take It Off
"When You Love Someone"    - 5:08
 From 1982 album Tongue in Chic
"Your Love Is Cancelled"  - 3:47
 From 1981 album Take It Off
"Believer"  - 5:08
 From 1983 album Believer
"You Are Beautiful"  - 4:15
 From 1983 album Believer
"Flashback" (Edwards, Rodgers) - 4:30
 From 1981 album Take It Off
"You Can't Do It Alone"  - 5:07
 From 1980 album Real People
"Tavern on the Green"  - 2:14
 From 1982 soundtrack album Soup For One

Production
 Bernard Edwards - producer for Chic Organization Ltd.
 Nile Rodgers - producer for Chic Organization Ltd.

Chic (band) compilation albums
Albums produced by Nile Rodgers
Albums produced by Bernard Edwards
1992 greatest hits albums
Atlantic Records compilation albums